Walsh Bay is a bay within Port Jackson, about  south of the suburb McMahons Point.  It is named after Henry Deane Walsh, Engineer-in-chief of the Sydney Harbour Trust. Walsh Bay is officially defined as that body of water that stretches from the Dawes Point (Aboriginal: Tar-ra)  in the north east, to the Millers Point (Aboriginal: Coodyee) in the southwest and the original shoreline has been altered to include developments now known as Piers 1 to 9.

In more recent times, Walsh Bay refers to the Walsh Bay Wharves Precinct or the Walsh Bay Arts Precinct, a harbour-side area in Sydney, located next to the neighbouring suburbs of Dawes Point and Millers Point that historically was a working port. The wharves were converted to apartments, theatres, restaurants, cafes and a hotel, and in 2015 was designated as a major arts precinct. Much of the precinct is listed on the New South Wales State Heritage Register.

The bay was first named in 1918 on drawings of a major new ‘wharfage scheme’ to modernise all Sydney’s docks to handle steamships and motor vehicles. The rejuvenation was planned by Henry Deane Walsh as engineer-in-chief of the Sydney Harbour Trust. Its then-chairman, Robert Rowan Purdon Hickson, lent his name to Hickson Road, the new freight thoroughfare around this headland.

History

The precinct was originally known by the Aboriginal names of Tar-ra and Tullagalla. The wharf was constructed from 1912 to 1921.

See also
The Hungry Mile

http://walshbayhistory.net/

References

Geography of Sydney
Redeveloped ports and waterfronts in Australia
Sydney localities
Tourist attractions in Sydney
Sydney Harbour